Anaid Iplicjian (born 24 October 1935) is a German actress.

Biography
She is of Armenian descent. After studying at the Mozarteum Academy in Salzburg she has been a member of the Graz (Austria), Wiesbaden, the State Theatre Hannover and the Burgtheater (Vienna) companies. A freelance actress since 1970, she has been working on Frankfurt/Main, Hamburg, Berlin, Munich and Vienna stages. 

She has appeared many times in German and Austrian television. She was the presenter of the Eurovision Song Contest 1957.

Selected filmography
Derrick - Season 02, Episode 06: "Paddenberg" (1975)
Derrick - Season 07, Episode 10: "Eine unheimlich starke Persönlichkeit" (1980)
Derrick - Season 11, Episode 01: "Das Mädchen in Jeans" (1984)

See also
 List of Eurovision Song Contest presenters

External links
 
 ZBF Agency Munich 

German stage actresses
German television actresses
1935 births
Living people
Actresses from Berlin

German people of Armenian descent